Monica Faenzi (born 21 May 1965) is an Italian politician who served as Mayor of Castiglione della Pescaia from 2001 to 2011 and as Deputy for two legislatures (2008–2013, 2013–2018).

References

1965 births
Mayors of places in Tuscany
Deputies of Legislature XVI of Italy
Deputies of Legislature XVII of Italy
Politicians from Grosseto
Women mayors of places in Italy
21st-century Italian women politicians
Forza Italia politicians
Forza Italia (2013) politicians
The People of Freedom politicians
Living people
Women members of the Chamber of Deputies (Italy)